Jimmy Creech is a former United Methodist Church minister who was defrocked for marrying same-sex couples.
He was a founding member of the North Carolina Religious Coalition for Marriage Equality, an interfaith same-sex marriage advocacy group, co-author of the Dallas Principles, was a participant in the Marriage Equality Express, and is the current Board Chairman of the North Carolina Social Justice Project, a progressive policy and advocacy organization dedicated to eliminating inequality in North Carolina.

Creech appeared in A Union in Wait, a 2001 Sundance Channel documentary film about same-sex marriage.  In 2007 Creech became the executive director of Faith In America, a non-profit organisation founded by Mitchell Gold, focused on educating people about religion-based bigotry.

Creech's memoir, Adam's Gift: A Memoir of a Pastor’s Calling to Defy the Church's Persecution of Lesbians and Gays was published by Duke University Press in 2011. He was interviewed on The State of Things on WUNC on April 11, 2011, to discuss his new book.

References

LGBT and Protestantism
American LGBT rights activists
Living people
Year of birth missing (living people)